Duncan Macrae or Duncan MacRae may refer to:
 Duncan Macrae (actor) (1905–1967), Scottish actor
 Duncan Macrae (rugby union) (1914–2007), Scottish rugby union footballer
 Duncan MacRae (rugby league) (1934–2019), New Zealand rugby league footballer
Donnchadh MacRath aka Duncan MacRae of Inverinate (died between 1693 and 1704), Gaelic poet and compiler

See also
Duncan McRae (disambiguation)